Aleksandar Filipović (born 20 December 1994) is a Serbian professional footballer, who plays as a defender for Serbian club Partizan.

Club career
On 21 May 2011, aged 16, Filipović made his senior debut for Jagodina, coming on as a late second-half substitute for Miloš Stojanović in a 4–2 away league win against Rad. He spent the next five seasons at the club before moving to Voždovac in the 2016 summer transfer window.

In early 2018, Filipović was transferred abroad to Belarusian champions BATE Borisov.

International career
Filipović represented Serbia at the 2011 UEFA European Under-17 Championship. He was also a member of the winning squad at the 2013 UEFA European Under-19 Championship. Finally, Filipović represented Serbia at the 2017 UEFA European Under-21 Championship.

In November 2017, Filipović received his first call-up to the full Serbia squad by Mladen Krstajić for a friendly against South Korea.

Statistics

Honours

Club
Jagodina
 Serbian Cup: Runner-up 2013–14

BATE Borisov
 Belarusian Premier League: 2018

 Belarusian Cup: 2019–20, 2020–21

 Belarusian Super Cup: 2022

International
Serbia
 UEFA Under-19 Championship: 2013

Notes

References

External links
 

1994 births
Living people
Serbian footballers
Sportspeople from Leskovac
Association football defenders
Belarusian Premier League players
Serbian expatriate footballers
Serbian expatriate sportspeople in Belarus
Expatriate footballers in Belarus
FC BATE Borisov players
FK Jagodina players
FK Voždovac players
FK Partizan players
Serbia under-21 international footballers
Serbia youth international footballers
Serbian SuperLiga players